Joost Alois Businger (born 29 March 1924) is a Dutch-American meteorologist. He is an emeritus professor at the University of Washington. Businger is best known for his work on atmospheric boundary layer (ABL).

Career
Businger was born in Haarlem, the Netherlands, on 29 March 1924. He obtained his PhD in physics and meteorology from Utrecht University in 1954. As a PhD student he did research on turbulent transfer of heat, mass and momentum in the atmospheric surface layer. He came up with a similar concept around the same time as the Monin–Obukhov similarity theory was founded in the Soviet Union, with the two concepts varying slightly. Businger subsequently spend some time at the Institute of Horticultural Engineering of Wageningen University. At the institute he studied microclimate in greenhouses and the protection of crops from frost by use of sprinklers. Wishing to study atmospheric science further, Businger saw no options to do so in the Netherlands. He thus sent out inquiry letters to different universities in the United States, and in 1956 was hired as research associate by the University of Wisconsin–Madison.

In 1958 Businger was hired assistant professor at the University of Washington. In 1961 he was promoted to associate professor. He became a full professor in 1964. Businger retired from the University of Washington in 1983. He then started working at the National Center for Atmospheric Research and retired fully in 1989.

Businger has been described as one of the first to recognize the scientific and practical importance of the atmospheric boundary layer (ABL) and worked on the development of the sonic anemometer.

In 2001, Businger was elected a member of the National Academy of Engineering for contributions to the field of atmospheric turbulence transport and its applications.

Honours and distinctions
Businger was elected a corresponding member of the Royal Netherlands Academy of Arts and Sciences in 1980. He was elected a member of the National Academy of Engineering in 2001. Businger was awarded the Vilhelm Bjerknes Medal by the European Geophysical Society in 2003, "for his fundamental contributions to the understanding of atmospheric turbulence and boundary layer processes and structure".

Apart from his scientific career Businger is known for his conservation efforts on Guemes Island and Sinclair Island.

References

External links
 Profile at the University of Washington

1924 births
Living people
American meteorologists
Dutch meteorologists
Members of the Royal Netherlands Academy of Arts and Sciences
Members of the United States National Academy of Engineering
Scientists from Haarlem
University of Washington faculty
Utrecht University alumni
Dutch emigrants to the United States